Christian Meeting House (Petersburg Christian Church) is a historic church meeting house at 6561 Tanner Street in Petersburg, Kentucky.

The  original congregation was organized in 1824 by Alexander Campbell from Virginia.  The structure was built in 1840 and added to the National Register of Historic Places in 1989.

The architecture reflects the shift in styles from the classical Greek Revival to the more romantic or picturesque forms prevalent in Boone County during the period 1835–1890. Stylistic modifications to the building made  in the 1870s include grouped brackets at the eaves, a decorative gable-peak of Gothic origins, and a louvered bell tower with pilasters and a concave-pyramidal peak.

References

See also
National Register of Historic Places listings in Kentucky

Churches on the National Register of Historic Places in Kentucky
Churches completed in 1840
19th-century churches in the United States
Churches in Boone County, Kentucky
National Register of Historic Places in Boone County, Kentucky
1840 establishments in Kentucky